In data structures, the range mode query problem asks to build a data structure on some input data to efficiently answer queries asking for the mode of any consecutive subset of the input.

Problem statement

Given an array , we wish to answer queries of the form , where . For example, if , then  because it occurs three times, while all other values occur fewer times. In this problem, the queries ask for the mode of subarrays of the form .

Theorem 1

Let  and  be any multisets.

Proof

Results

Lower bound

Any data structure using  cells of  bits each needs  time to answer a range mode query.

This contrasts with other range query problems, such as the range minimum query which have solutions offering constant time query time and linear space.

Linear space data structure with square root query time

This method by Chan et al. uses  space and  query time. By setting , we get  and  bounds for space and query time.

Preprocessing

Let  be an array, and  be an array that contains the distinct values of A, where  is the number of distinct elements.

Arrays  are also created, such that, for each , .

The array is split B into  blocks , each of size .
 algorithm computeS_Sprime is
     input: Array B = [0:n - 1], 
         Array D = [0:Delta - 1], 
         Integer s
     output: Tables S and Sprime
     let S ← Table(0:n - 1, 0:n - 1)
     let Sprime ← Table(0:n - 1, 0:n - 1)
     let firstOccurence ← Array(0:Delta - 1)
     for all i in {0, ..., Delta - 1} do
         firstOccurence[i] ← -1 
     end for
     for i ← 0:s - 1 do    
         let j ← i × t
         let c ← 0
         let fc ← 0
         let noBlock ← i
         let block_start ← j
         let block_end ← min{(i + 1) × t - 1, n - 1}
         while j < n do    
             if firstOccurence[B[j]] = -1 then
                 firstOccurence[B[j]] ← j
             end if		
             if atLeastQInstances(firstOccurence[B[j]], block_end, fc + 1) then
                 c ← B[j]
                 fc ← fc + 1
             end if		
             if j = block_end then
                 S[i * s + noBlock] ← c
                 Sprime[i × s + noBlock] ← fc			
                 noBlock ← noBlock + 1
                 block_end ← min{block_end + t, n - 1}
             end if
         end while
         for all j in {0, ..., Delta - 1} do
             firstOccurence[j] ← -1 
         end for
     end for

Query

We will define the query algorithm over array .

Given a query , the query is split in three parts: the prefix, the span and the suffix. The range of these blocks is called the span. The prefix, suffix or span can be empty, the latter is if .

If the span is empty, let .

Scanning procedure

The procedure is similar for both prefix and suffix, so it suffice to run this procedure for both:

Let  be the index of the current element. There are three cases:
Pass to the next element.
If it is not, then pass to the next element.

A further analysis of the linear scans done for frequency computations shows that it is also bounded by the block size.

Subquadratic space data structure with constant query time

This method by  uses  space for a constant time query.

Preprocessing

Let  be an array. The preprocessing is done in three steps:
The total space for this step is 
For any query , let  be the block that contains  and  be the block that contains . To access those tables, a pointer is added in addition to the mode in the table  for each pair of blocks. 

Query

Given a query , check if it is completely contained inside a block, in which case the answer is stored in table . If the query spans exactly one or more blocks, then the answer is found in table . This can be done in constant time.

References

Arrays